Francis Edwin Hodge  (December 1881 – 6 February 1949) was an English painter.

Biography
Born in Devon, Hodge studied at the Westminster School of Art and the Slade School of Fine Art. Among his other teachers were Augustus John, William Orpen and Frank Brangwyn and he also studied for a short time in Paris. Hodge enlisted in the Artists' Rifles at the start of World War I and served as a captain in the Royal Field Artillery on the Western Front. He continued to paint during the conflict and some of those paintings are now held by the Imperial War Museum. His work was entered to the painting event in the art competition at the 1932 Summer Olympics. During World War Two, the War Artists' Advisory Committee purchased examples of his work.

Membership
Hodge was a member of or affiliated with the following organisations:
 1915: Elected to the Royal Society of British Artists,
 1927: Elected member of Royal Institute of Oil Painters,
 1929: Elected member of the Royal Society of Portrait Painters,
 1931: Elected member of the Royal Institute of Painters in Watercolours
Hodge was also a member of the Chelsea Arts Club.

References

Andrew Ellis, Sonia Roe (eds.), Oil paintings in public ownership in the Imperial War Museum, Public Catalogue Foundation, 2006.

External links
 
  Works by Hodge in the Imperial War Museum

1881 births
1949 deaths
20th-century English painters
Alumni of the Slade School of Fine Art
British Army personnel of World War I
British war artists
English male painters
Artists from Devon
Royal Field Artillery officers
World War I artists
World War II artists
Olympic competitors in art competitions
20th-century English male artists